La Vieux-Rue is a commune in the Seine-Maritime department in the Normandy region in northern France.

Geography

Population

Places of interest
 The church of St. Martin, dating from the thirteenth century.
 The chateau, dating from the seventeenth century.
 The sixteenth-century manorhouse of Saint-Saire.

See also
Communes of the Seine-Maritime department

References

External links

Website of the Mairie 
Website of a local association 

Communes of Seine-Maritime